The Polish Institute and Sikorski Museum, known as Sikorski Institute, named after General Władysław Sikorski, is a leading London-based museum and archive for research into Poland during World War II and the Polish diaspora. It is a non-governmental organisation managed by scholars from the Polish community in the United Kingdom, housed at 20 Prince's Gate in West London, in a Grade II listed terrace on Kensington Road facing Hyde Park. It is incidentally part of the same Victorian development by Charles James Freake as the nearby Polish Hearth Club. Although the institute is closer to the commercial centres of Kensington, it is just within the City of Westminster. In 1988 it merged with the formerly independent Polish Underground Movement (1939–1945) Study Trust –.

Origins

It was created immediately on the conclusion of the Second World War, on 2 May 1945, to preserve the memory of the Polish Underground State in Occupied Poland, its links to the Polish government-in-exile initially in France then in London, the Polish armed forces in the West and their contribution to World War II. At that time the communist takeover of Poland made it hazardous if not impossible for many exiled Polish ex-servicemen and civilians to return to their native country, after one third of Poland's territory was ceded to the Soviet Union under the Yalta Accords and the native Polish civilian population killed or forcibly deported. It is also a research centre and museum and publisher of historical issues which were either banned or censored in the then People's Republic of Poland.

Activities
The institute has conserved historical records, including witness records from the Warsaw Uprising in 1944, documents, regimental colours, military medals, uniforms, insignia, works of art, a library and many personal effects which had once belonged to Polish statesmen, diplomats, academics, military leaders and ordinary men and women. The institute's unrivalled film and photographic archive of over 5,000 photographs was digitised by Karta during 2005–6 and is available in Poland for exhibitions and educational initiatives. Around 2006 the institute received a chance find of 2,000 photographs taken by photographer Jan Markiewicz of the early Polish community in 1950s South London, which a passer-by retrieved from a skip in Brixton.

Study Trust of the Polish Underground State

Founded in 1948, by a group of veterans led by general Tadeusz Bór-Komorowski the Polish Underground Movement (1939–1945) Study Trust – Studium Polski Podziemnej w Londynie, known as the Studium, amalgamated with the institute in 1988. Although it lost its separate legal status, it was granted internal autonomy to carry out its own research and publications from its base in Ealing.

Governance
The institute and Sikorski Museum is divided into the following departments and sections: 
 Archives 
 Museum, including the Photographic Archive, the Film Archive and the Sound Archive 
 Reference Library
 Administration 
 Publications
 Regimental Colours Fund

The institute is governed by a Council which elects the Executive Committee from among its members who run the day-to-day business of the institute. The chairman heads the Council and Executive Committee. Membership consists of honorary members (nominated by the AGM), full members chosen by the Council, life members by single donation and annual members.  

Since its inception the institute has had seven chairmen:

 Prof. Stanisław Stroński PhD (1945–1951)
 Lt. Gen. Prof. Marian Kukiel PhD (1951-c.1965)
 Count Edward Raczyński PhD (c.1965–1976)
 Stanisław Leśniowski MSc (1977–1979)
 Capt. Ryszard Dembiński (1979–2004)
 Krzysztof Barbarski CEng (2004–2022)
 Krzysztof deBerg (2022 - )

See also
 History of Poland (1939–45)
 Polish government in exile
 Poles in the United Kingdom
 Polish Library in Paris
 Polish Museum, Rapperswil
 Institute of National Remembrance

References

Bibliography
 "Documents on Polish-Soviet Relations, 1939–1945", General Sikorski Historical Institute, London: Heinemann. 1967.
  Milewski, Waclaw. Suchcitz, Andrzej. Gorczycki, Andrzej. (Eds.) "Guide to the Archives of the Polish Institute and Sikorski Museum". 1985
  Suchcitz, Andrzej. O Instytucie Polskim i Muzeum im. gen. Sikorskiego w Londynie, Pamiętnik Literacki, tom XIII, Londyn 1988 – About the Polish Institute and Sikorski Museum in London, a Memoire (in Polish). 
  Suchcitz, Andrzej. Powstanie Instytutu Historycznego im gen. Sikorskiego, [w:] Idea Europy i Polska w XIX-XX wieku, Towarzystwo Przyjaciół Ossolineum, Wrocław 1999 – The creation of the Historical Sikorski Institute in "The Idea of Europe and Poland in the 19th and 20th centuries". Association of the Friends of the Ossolineum. (in Polish).

Gallery

External links
 The Sikorski Institute's 
 Website of the Study Trust of the Polish Underground State, available in English, German and Polish.
 The National Archives listing with location map of the Sikorski Institute.

Diaspora organisations based in London
Poland–United Kingdom relations
Buildings and structures in the City of Westminster
1945 establishments in England
Learned societies of the United Kingdom
1945 establishments in the United Kingdom
Polish culture
Museums of Polish culture abroad
Museums in the City of Westminster
World War II museums in London
Cold War museums in the United Kingdom
Grade II listed buildings in the City of Westminster
Grade II listed museum buildings
Archives in the City of Westminster
Charities based in London
Libraries in the City of Westminster
Literary archives in London